Braxton Mitchell (born May 20, 2000) is an American politician and businessman serving as a Republican member of the Montana House of Representatives from the 3rd district. Elected in 2020, he assumed office on January 4, 2021, and became one of the youngest elected officials in the country.

Early life and education
Mitchell was born in Columbia Falls, Montana. Mitchell grew up working for his family's businesses in Columbia Falls, most notably Montana Jerky Company.

While attending Columbia Falls High School, he organized a pro-gun walkout after millions of students nationwide walked out to protest gun rights. Mitchell attended Flathead Valley Community College after high school.

Career 
Mitchell's involvement in politics began in 2017 during a special election for Montana's lone congressional district, where Republican Greg Gianforte defeated Democrat Rob Quist. Mitchell saw many of his own beliefs reflected in Gianforte, and helped with his campaign as a high school student.

In 2020, he ran for the 3rd district of the Montana House of Representatives. Mitchell defeated incumbent Democrat Debo Powers in the November general election by 20 points, and became one of the youngest elected officials in the country.

In 2022, he filed for re-election. In June of 2022, Mitchell faced a Republican primary challenger who Mitchell accused of being a Democrat because she changed her party affiliation just days before the filing deadline. Mitchell easily defeated his primary challenger with over 73% of the vote. In November 2022, Mitchell easily won re-election.

Mitchell currently serves as a member on the powerful House Judiciary Committee, the House Education Committee, and the House Agricultural Committee. In his first session, Mitchell served as a member on the House Taxation Committee, the House Education Committee, and the House Fish, Wildlife, and Parks Committee.

Mitchell has served as an Ambassador for Turning Point USA, an American conservative nonprofit organization founded by Charlie Kirk that advocates to identify, educate, train, and organize high school and college students to “promote the principles of freedom, free markets, and limited government.”

Montana House of Representatives

State Veterans Cemetery
In January 2023, Mitchell sponsored successful legislation that would set aside 150 acres of land adjacent to the Montana Veterans Home in Columbia Falls, Montana to create a State Veterans Cemetery in his district. The cemetery will be open to veterans in nine Montana counties: Lincoln, Sanders, Flathead, Lake, Glacier, Toole, Pondera, Teton and Liberty counties. "These veterans deserve everything for their sacrifices," Mitchell said in a statement after the bill passed the House. "It's a great day for Flathead County, Northwest Montana and Montana as a whole."

Hunting Licenses
During the 2023 Legislative session, Mitchell sponsored House Bill 162 which would give Montana hunters the option to electronically validate their hunting tags. Traditionally in Montana, hunter’s receive paper tags that are used to verify their harvest, and Mitchell’s legislation allows for the optional availability for any carcass tag to be electronically validated with a smart phone. Mitchell’s bill was signed into law by Republican Governor Greg Gianforte on March 16, 2023.

Transgender Athletes In Sports
Mitchell supported a bill in the Montana Legislature that sought to ban transgender athletes from competing on teams that do not align with their sex at birth. He stated that "Someone gender fluid can wake up one morning and say, 'I'm a man today,' or 'I'm a woman today,' as a tactic to win in sports." The bill was signed into law by Republican Governor Greg Gianforte on May 7, 2021.

Jell-O Shots
In 2023, Mitchell introduced legislation to legalize Jell-O shots. At the time of the bill’s introduction, Montana was 1 of only 2 states that prohibited the selling and distribution of premade Jell-O shots. In committee which featured no opponents, Mitchell said the proposal was a “freedom bill” and supporters cited that “Jell-O shots are not daily consumables but usually tailored towards events such as weddings, bachelorette parties, concerts, and tailgates.” The measure passed the Montana House of Representatives in February of 2023.

State Surplus
In September 2022, Mitchell was 1 of 53 Republican Legislators to call for a special session of the Montana Legislature to discuss returning over $1.8 billion in excess tax revenue to resident homeowners who paid property taxes in the past two years, and up to $1,250 to people who paid income taxes during that time. Mitchell stated "This is not a stimulus check or us printing money like we see Biden and the Democrats doing at the federal level — it’s a true returning of funds. I am sure professional politicians and Helena insiders could think of 1.8 billion reasons to spend this money elsewhere but, the fact is, it is yours. It also can help force the hand of the legislature to finally rewrite our tax system we currently have in place which is hurting our citizens and businesses. Things worth doing are hard, and voters expect us to serve them, so I’m calling on my fellow legislators to support a special session."

Coal Power
Mitchell sponsored a measure that would have made it more difficult for a private utility company in Montana to shutter a power plant, a move aimed at blocking the closing of the Colstrip coal-fired power plant in eastern Montana. The measure was tabled in March 2021. The Colstrip plant's owners, Puget Sound Energy, closed two of the four units at the plant in January 2021, and announced that the remaining two units would close within five years.

Domestic terrorism resolution
In February 2021, Mitchell introduced a resolution designating antifa as a domestic terrorism group. Antifa-affiliated groups are not known to be active in Montana, and there were no riots in Montana during the George Floyd protests of 2020. Mitchell stated "I just don’t want to go into a future where political violence becomes the norm, and I hope as a country, we can start moving away from political violence on both sides."

Mitchell was asked by Montana Democrats to also designate other groups including that which stormed the United States Capitol in January 2021, but Mitchell stated that the resolution was aimed at offenses committed by antifa. The resolution originally had 53 co-sponsors, but following his explanation that additional groups couldn't be added, 31 Republicans removed their names. The resolution did not pass out of the House.

Electoral history

2020 election

2022 general election

References

External links 
 Braxton Mitchell at ballotpedia.org
 Braxton Mitchell at followthemoney.org

Living people
2000 births
21st-century American politicians
Republican Party members of the Montana House of Representatives
People from Flathead County, Montana
People from Columbia Falls, Montana
People from Whitefish, Montana
People from Kalispell, Montana
American Christians
American evangelicals